Shim may refer to:

 Shim (spacer), a thin and often tapered or wedged piece of material
 CPU shim, a spacer for a computer heat sink
 Shim (fencing), a device used in the sport fencing
 Shim (lock pick), a tool used to bypass padlocks
 Shim (computing), an application compatibility workaround
 Shim (magnetism), a device used to adjust the homogeneity of a magnetic field
 Shim (band), an Australian hard rock band

Microscopy
 Second-harmonic imaging microscopy
 Scanning helium ion microscope

People
 Shim (surname)
 Sim (Korean surname), pronounced "shim"
 Shim (musician) (born 1983), Israeli singer-songwriter and artist

See also
 
 
 Shimmer (disambiguation)
 Shimon (disambiguation)
 Sim (disambiguation)